Brendan J. M. Bohannan is a microbial and evolutionary biologist. He is a professor of Environmental Studies and Biology at the director of the Institute of Ecology and Evolution at the University of Oregon. He is a contributor to the Proceedings of the National Academy of Sciences. He is an Alec and Kay Keith Professor at the University of Oregon. In 2019, along with colleagues Karen Guillemin, Judith Eisen and biophysicist Raghuveer Parthasarathy, Bohannan was awarded a $7.6 million grant from the National Institutes of Health to research the potential health benefits of Bacteria. He is one of the world's experts on the microbes of the Amazon rain forest, and was one of four speakers to participate in Cornell's Life Sciences Lecture Series in 2018–2019. Before becoming a professor at the University of Oregon, Bohannan was an assistant professor of biological sciences at Stanford University.

References 

Living people
Year of birth missing (living people)
University of Oregon faculty
American microbiologists
Evolutionary biologists
Place of birth missing (living people)
Fellows of the American Academy of Microbiology